"Shut Out" is a single from the Paul Jabara album of the same name and features special guest vocals by Donna Summer. On the album, it is used as the first half of a medley another with another song called "Heaven Is a Disco".

Paul Jabara would later be responsible for writing two of Summer's biggest hits—"Last Dance" and the duet with Barbra Streisand, "No More Tears (Enough Is Enough)".

Charts

References

Donna Summer songs
1977 singles
Songs written by Paul Jabara
Casablanca Records singles
1977 songs